The term Tier One Special Mission Unit or Special Missions Unit (SMU) is a term sometimes used, particularly in the United States, to describe some highly secretive military special operations forces. Special mission units have been involved in high-profile military operations, such as the killing of Osama bin Laden.

United States
The United States military definition in the Department of Defense Dictionary of Military and Associated Terms comes from Joint Publication 3-05.1 – Joint Special Operations Task Force Operations (JP 3-05.1). JP 3-05.1 defines a "special mission unit" as "a generic term to represent a group of operations and support personnel from designated organizations that is task-organized to perform highly classified activities."

The U.S. government does not acknowledge which units specifically are designated as special missions units, only that they have special mission units within the Joint Special Operations Command (JSOC), which is part of U.S. Special Operations Command (SOCOM). In the early 1990s then–Commander in Chief of SOCOM, General Carl Stiner, identified both Delta Force and SEAL Team Six as permanently assigned special mission units in congressional testimony and public statements. In 1998, Under Secretary of Defense for Policy Walter B. Slocombe publicly referred to special mission units during a briefing to the Senate Armed Services Committee: "We have designated special mission units that are specifically manned, equipped and trained to deal with a wide variety of transnational threats" and "These units, assigned to or under the operational control of the U.S. Special Operations Command, are focused primarily on those special operations and supporting functions that combat terrorism and actively counter-terrorist use of weapons of mass destruction (WMD). These units are on alert every day of the year and have worked extensively with their interagency counterparts."

List of United States military SMU's
So far, the US military has publicly acknowledged four JSOC units as Special Mission Units:

The Army's 1st Special Forces Operational Detachment – Delta (1st SFOD-D), widely known as Delta Force, within JSOC they are called Task Force Green.
The Navy's Naval Special Warfare Development Group (DEVGRU), commonly known as SEAL TEAM 6, but within JSOC they are called Task Force Blue.
The Air Force's 24th Special Tactics Squadron (24 STS), within JSOC is called Task Force White.
The Army's Intelligence Support Activity, officially identified only by a series of code names which are replaced every two years. Originally tasked by the Army and subordinate to INSCOM, following the September 11 attacks control shifted to JSOC, who call the unit Task Force Orange.

A possible fifth SMU, the Army Ranger's Regimental Reconnaissance Company (RRC), part of U.S. Army Special Operations Command (USASOC), has also been referred to as an SMU.
RRC is often referred to as "The Company", but when they are on mission for JSOC, they are called Task Force Red.

Additional support 
Other units from the Army's 75th Ranger Regiment, as well as Special Forces, the 160th Special Operations Aviation Regiment (160 SOAR), and the Aviation Technology Office (ATO), and the joint Aviation Tactics Evaluation Group (AvTEG) are controlled by JSOC when deployed as part of JSOC Task Forces such as Task Force 121 and Task Force 145.

Australia
The Australian Army's elite Special Air Service Regiment is described as being a "special missions unit with unique capabilities within the Australian Defence Force". The Regiment is a component of Australia's Special Operations Command (SOCOMD), and is tasked with conducting "sensitive strategic operations, special recovery operations, training assistance, special reconnaissance and precision strike and direct action".

The SASR currently has four sabre squadrons, known as 1, 2, 3 and 4 Squadron. The first three squadrons rotate through the two roles performed by the Regiment; one squadron conducts the counter terrorism/special recovery (CT/SR) role, and the remaining squadrons conduct the warfighting/reconnaissance role, while 4 Squadron is responsible for collecting intelligence and also supports the Australian Secret Intelligence Service.

Notable operations

 On December 13, 2003, Members of Task Force 121 conducted a military operation in Ad-Dawr, Iraq which lead to the capture of former Iraqi president Saddam Hussein who was found hiding in a spider hole.

 On May 2, 2011, Osama Bin Laden was killed in a CIA SAD-led operation where U.S. Navy SEALs from DEVGRU's Red Squadron were flown into Abottabad, Pakistan by elements of 160th SOAR from Jalalabad, Afghanistan.

 On October 22, 2015, 30 U.S. special operations forces consisting of members of Delta Force, aviators from the 160th SOAR, paramilitary officers from the CIA's Special Activities Center and along with members of the Kurdish Counter-terrorism unit Peshmerga, conducted a raid on an ISIS prison compound north of the town of Hawija in Iraq's Kirkuk province which resulted in the liberation of approximately 70 hostages, including more than 20 members of the Iraqi Security Forces who were to be executed and buried in freshly dug graves. The operation left 1 Delta operator dead, MSG Joshua Wheeler, the first American to be killed by ISIS insurgents and the first American to be killed in Action in Iraq since November 2011. SGM Thomas Payne, then a SFC was awarded the Medal of Honor on September 11, 2020 for his actions that day.

 Between October 26 and 27, 2019 in Barisha, Idlib Governorate, Syria. Members of 1st SFOD-D (Delta Force) along with paramilitary officers from the CIA's Special Activities Center, Army Rangers from the 75th Ranger Regiment and aviators from the 160th SOAR conducted a raid that resulted in the death of Abu Bakr al-Baghdadi. The raid was named Operation Kayla Mueller after American human rights activist and humanitarian aid worker Kayla Mueller, who was captured in Syria, tortured, and eventually killed by ISIL on February 6, 2015. Baghdadi killed himself when he detonated a suicide belt while seeking to evade the U.S. forces during the raid after reaching a dead end in a tunnel. Two Delta operators and one military working dog (Conan) were injured from Baghdadi's suicide belt but sustained no life threatening injuries.

References

Special Operations Forces of the United States
Military terminology